gThumb is a free and open-source image viewer and image organizer with options to edit images. It is designed to have a clean and simple user interface and follows GNOME HIG, it integrates well with the GNOME desktop environment.

Features 
gThumb allows the filesystem to be browsed for images. They can be organized into catalogs, or viewed as a slideshow. Folders and catalogs can be bookmarked, and comments can be added to images.

Via gPhoto it can also acquire data directly from digital cameras.

gThumb offers a certain range of image editing operations suited for digital photography, such as the change of image hue, saturation, lightness, contrast or the adjustment of colors and sharpness. It can also crop, scale and rotate images by 90° or custom angles, and it features a red-eye effect removal function. Manipulated images can be saved in the formats JPEG, PNG, TIFF, .tga, and WebP.

gThumb can export web-based photograph albums with various theme templates. These albums can be uploaded to a website, providing a very simple mechanism for publishing collections of photos on the web.

gThumb also includes many basic features such as copying, moving, deleting or duplicating images, printing, zooming, format transcoding, and batch renaming.

Dependencies 
gThumb only requires glib (>= 2.36.0), gtk (>= 3.16), gthread, gmodule and gio-unix. Libraries that are not mandatory but possible include exiv2, libjpeg, LibTIFF, LibRaw, and JPEG XL's libjxl.

History 
The first public version was 0.2 in 2001.

It was originally based on GQView. Starting from version 2.12.0 gThumb allows users to export images to various websites. Version 3.0.0 is based on GTK version 3, and supports high quality SVG zoom.

Gallery

See also 

 Comparison of image viewers
 Eye of GNOME
 Darktable
 digiKam

References

External links

 

Free image organizers
Free image viewers
Free photo software
Free software programmed in C
GNOME Applications
Graphics software that uses GTK
Linux image viewers
Photo software for Linux